Ardaas is an Indian Punjabi-language film. It is directed and written by Gippy Grewal and the dialogues are written by Rana Ranbir and was released on 11 March 2016.

Plot 
The movie revolves around Master Gurmukh (Gurpreet Ghuggi) and how he arrives in a new village as this posting in government school and helping various villagers by reminding them of their good values and teaching them more meanwhile facing his own inner guilt.

Cast
 Gurpreet Ghuggi as Master Gurmukh Singh
 Ammy Virk as Agyapal Singh/Aasi 
 B.N. Sharma as Subedar Saab
 Karamjit Anmol as Shambhu Nath/Lala
 Rana Ranbir as Lottery (Postman)
 Mandy Takhar as Binder
 Sardar Sohi as Diler Singh Sohi (Aasi's Father)
 Isha Rikhi as Mannat Brar
 Meher Vij as Baani 
 Satwant Kaur as Lady Doctor
 Harby Sangha as Nagraaj/Sapp
 Gippy Grewal as Sukhi (Cameo Appearance)

Track list

Reception
Ardaas was premiered on 10 March 2016 as part of Punjabi International Film Festival Toronto 2016 in Brampton (Canada). Bollywood superstar Aamir Khan praised the story and trailer of the film.

Box office

First time in history of Punjabi cinema two major Superstars' films were released on same day, Ardaas and Love Punjab.

Ardaas grossed  at 61 screens and failed to beat overseas box-office records of Love Punjab and Diljit Dosanjh's Sardaar Ji.

Critical response
The Tribune reviewed Ardaas as a film that will touch every heart as it doesn't have a lesson but has meaning. CNN-IBN reviewed Ardaas as a film that will help you understand how every experience in life that has the potential of becoming a spiritual experience.

Sequel
The second film of the franchise Ardaas Karaan (film) was released on 19 July 2019. 
The third film of the franchise "Ardaas Sarbat De Bhalle Di" will be released in 2021 as stated by Gippy Grewal on social media

References 

2016 films
Punjabi-language Indian films
2010s Punjabi-language films
Films scored by Jatinder Shah
2016 directorial debut films